Marcus Füreder (born 27 November 1974), better known by his stage name Parov Stelar, is an Austrian musician, composer, producer, DJ and designer. His musical style is based on a combination of jazz, house, electro, hip hop, and pop.

Biography
Marcus Füreder first appeared as a DJ at nightclubs during the mid-late 1990s. He became involved in producing and publishing in 2000. Having released his first maxi singles on Bushido using his real name and his stage name Plasma, Füreder founded the record label Etage Noir Recordings in 2003. A year later, under the stage name Parov Stelar, the EP Kiss Kiss was released, followed by the LP Rough Cuts. Parov Stelar has worked with Lana Del Rey, Bryan Ferry, and Lady Gaga.

Cleo Panther was the lead singer for Parov Stelar from 2011 to 2019. She was replaced with Elena Karafizi, who "brings a versatile musical background" from her hometown of Chisinau, Moldova. Soul singer Anduze co-inhabits the lead singer position alongside Elena. He officially joined the band in 2018, but has been working with Parov Stelar since 2012 as a writer and featured artist. In the summer of 2021 Parov Stelar gave the first insight into his work as a visual artist in his hometown of Linz. The Francisco Carolinum Museum presented 25 large-format paintings such as "HELLO Mom" - a homage to his mother Margit Füreder, who is also active as an artist - "I'll be OK soon" as well as "Toxic Lover" in which he receives and artistically processes autobiographical events and fears.

Critical reception
Parov Stelar won ten Amadeus Austrian Music Awards: Electronic/Dance (2012, 2013, 2015 and 2016, 2019, 2020, 2021), Album of the Year for The Princess (2013), and Best Live Act (2013 and 2014). The track "Booty Swing" charted positions in the electronic US and Canadian iTunes charts. "All Night" reached double platinum status for 100,000 tracks sold in Italy in May 2017. In May 2018, the song "The Sun" featuring Graham Candy and in April 2020, the release "Voodoo Sonic Part 2" reached the No.1 chart position in the US iTunes Electronic Charts.

Personal life
He was married to Barbara Lichtenauer (better known by her stage name Lilja Bloom), with whom he co-founded the design label Stelarbloom. Stelar and Bloom divorced in early 2020.

Discography

Albums

Singles & EPs

References

External links

 Official website
 Parov Stelar at Discogs
 BBC music's review of his album Shine

Austrian male musicians
Austrian DJs
Austrian record producers
Breakbeat musicians
Electronica musicians
Electro swing musicians
Intelligent dance musicians
Remixers
1974 births
Living people
Musicians from Linz
Downtempo musicians
Electronic dance music DJs
Male jazz musicians
Composers from Linz